William Paul Miller (July 26, 1927 – July 1, 2003) was an American pitcher in Major League Baseball (MLB) who played from  through  for the New York Yankees (1952–1954) and Baltimore Orioles (1955).
 
In his four-season MLB career, Miller posted a 6–9 record  and a 4.24 ERA in 41 appearances, including 18 starts, five complete games, two shutouts and one save. In 131⅔ innings of work, he surrendered 136 hits and 79 bases on balls with 158 strikeouts. He was a member of the Yankees teams that won the World Series in 1952 and 1953, though he did not pitch during the postseason. After the 1954 season, Miller was part of one of the largest trades in Major League history, a 17-player swap between the Yankees and Orioles that also included Gene Woodling, Gus Triandos, Don Larsen and Bob Turley.

But after only five games with the 1955 Orioles, four in relief, Miller was sent to the minor leagues. He retired after the 1956 season, his 12th as a professional.

Miller died of congestive heart failure at age 75.

References

External links 
Baseball Reference
Retrosheet

1927 births
2003 deaths
Baltimore Orioles players
Baseball players from Pennsylvania
Jacksonville Tars players
Jersey City Giants players
Kansas City Blues (baseball) players
Knoxville Smokies players
Lexington A's players
Major League Baseball pitchers
Martinsville A's players
New York Yankees players
People from Minersville, Pennsylvania
St. Louis Browns players
Shreveport Sports players
Sioux City Soos players
Statesville Owls players
Syracuse Chiefs players
Toronto Maple Leafs (International League) players